D Train or D-Train may refer to:

Entertainment
 D Train (music group), R&B duo
 D. Train (album), 1982
 James D-Train Williams (born 1962), American singer
 The D Train, a 2015 American film

Transportation
 D (New York City Subway service), New York City
 D-Zug, a type of express train service in Germany, Austria and Switzerland
 Green Line D branch, Greater Boston
 Vivarail D-Train, a family of multiple unit trains built by Vivarail for the British rail network
D Line (Los Angeles Metro), a rapid transit line in Los Angeles County, California

Other
 Dontrelle Willis or "The D-Train" (born 1982), American baseball player

See also
 4D (train), a prototype double deck electric train, Victoria, Australia
 D Line (disambiguation)
 D Stock